Last of the Summer Wine's twenty-third series aired on BBC One. All of the episodes were written by Roy Clarke and produced and directed by Alan J. W. Bell.

Outline
The trio in this series consisted of:

Last appearances

Wesley Pegden (1982, 1984–2002)
Eli Duckett (1987–2002)

List of Episodes

2001 Christmas Special

Regular series

DVD release
The box set for series twenty-three was released by Universal Playback in April 2012, mislabelled as a box set for series 23 & 24.

References

See also

Last of the Summer Wine series
2002 British television seasons